Ipomyia is a genus of wood midges in the family Cecidomyiidae. The one described species - Ipomyia bornemisszai - is only known from Australia. The genus was established by Australian entomologist Donald Henry Colless in 1965.

References

Cecidomyiidae genera

Insects described in 1965
Monotypic Diptera genera
Diptera of Australasia
Insects of Australia
Taxa named by Donald Henry Colless